Nothing But Coincidence is a 1949 West German comedy film directed by E. W. Emo and starring Theo Lingen, Sonja Ziemann, and Josef Meinrad. It was shot at the Göttingen Studios in northern Germany. The film's sets were designed by the art directors Hans Ledersteger and Ernst Richter.

Cast

References

External links

1949 comedy films
German comedy films
West German films
Films directed by E. W. Emo
German black-and-white films
1940s German films
Films shot at Göttingen Studios
1940s German-language films